The Colegio Bilingüe Vista Hermosa ("Vista Hermosa Bilingual School") is a bilingual Spanish-English private school in Zone 15 of Guatemala City. It serves pre-primary through secondary, including high school. The school was established in 1978.

References

External links
 Colegio Bilingüe Vista Hermosa webpage

Schools in Guatemala City
Educational institutions established in 1978
1978 establishments in Guatemala